Cyperus meistostylus is a species of sedge that is native to parts of New Guinea.

See also 
 List of Cyperus species

References 

meistostylus
Plants described in 1947
Flora of New Guinea
Taxa named by Stanley Thatcher Blake